The Marine Infantry is the naval infantry unit of the Spanish Navy responsible for conducting amphibious warfare by utilizing naval platforms and resources. The Marine Corps is fully integrated into the Armada's structure.

Mission 

The Spanish Marine Infantry is an elite corps, highly specialised in amphibious warfare, that is, to project an amphibious force onto a hostile, or potentially hostile, coast. Its ability to embark on a short term notice with (land, air and naval) Navy assets, makes it a unit with a high strategic value. Adding to this a high degree of training, and the capability to deploy swiftly in international waters, results in a potent dissuasive force available at a short notice in distant regions.

One of the main characteristics of a marine is the uniform that he wears. On the sleeves of the Spanish Marines are the three "Sardinetas", which marks it as a member of the Royal House Corps. This was given in recognition for a heroic last stand in the Castillo del Morro of Havana, Cuba against a British expedition in 1762. The only other unit to wear the sardinetas and red trouser stripes is the Spanish Royal Guard. Spanish Marines have modern assets to comply with its mission, having personnel specialised in artillery, sapping, helicopters, special operations, communications, tanks, among others. Some vehicles form the Grupo Mecanizado Anfibio del Tercio de Armada (the Mechanized Amphibious Group of the Navy Tercio).

The Marines of Spain are not only a fleet force, as the Spanish Royal Marine Guard Company are responsible for the defense and security forces of naval bases and facilities, naval schools and training units, and all facilities that support the Marines themselves.

History

First period 

But it was Philip II who established today's concept of a landing force. This was a pure naval power projection ashore by forces deployed from ships that could maintain their ability to fight despite being based on board. This is the period of the famous Tercios (literally "One Third", due to its organisation: one third of musketeers, one third of swordsmen and the final third of pikemen):
 .
 .
 .
 .

Of the Tercios above, the first is considered the core of the Spanish Marine Infantry, and it bears in its coat of arms two crossed anchors that became the Corps' coat of arms until 1931.

In 1704, the Tercios became regiments: Regimiento de Bajeles (Vessel's Regiments), Regimiento de la Armada (Navy Regiment), R. del Mar de Nápoles (Naples' Sea Regiment), and R. de Marina de Sicilia (Sicily's Navy Regiment), detaching some small units to the Army, and the main body remained in the Navy becoming the Cuerpo de Batallones de Marina (Navy Battalions Corps).

The battles that the marines served in during this very busy period included:
 Algiers expedition (1541).
 Battle of Lepanto (1571).
 Tunisia expedition (1573).
 The conquest of Terceira Island (Azores) (1582).
 Great Britain expedition (1599).
 San Salvador (Brazil) expedition (1625).

Second period 
In 1717 the Cuerpo de Batallones de Marina was definitively settled and organized into a 12-battalion corps with a corresponding regimental HQ overseeing the supervision of these units. The first ones were named: Armada, Bajeles, Marina, Oceano, Mediterráneo and Barlovento. Their mission was to form the "Main body of landing columns and ship's soldiers tasks" in a time that boarding was still a critical part of battle at sea. They were also gun crews. In 1728 the battalion Mediterráneo and in 1731 the battalion Barlovento were disbanded. 
 In 1741 there were eight battalions and ten years later another was added. In 1740 a marine artillery corps was founded. At mid 18th century there were 12,000 marine infantry and 3,000 marine gunners. The infantry formed boarding parties while the gunners manned the ship cannons. As needed landing parties were formed. Both corps also garrisoned the navy's coastal fortresses. During the War of Spanish Independence both the marine infantry and the marine artillery was reorganized as an administrative division of seven regiments, mainly fighting on land as part of army divisions in an operational role.

In a 1793, a woman, Ana Maria de Soto, disguised as a man, and answering to the name of Antonio Maria de Soto, enlisted in the 6th company of 11° Battalion of the Navy, being licensed with pension and honors in 1798, when she was discovered to be a woman. 

The major actions they took part in during this period were:
 Sardinia, 1717
 Naples and Sicily, 1732
 Battle of Cartagena de Indias, 1741
 Defence of Havana, 1762
 Algiers expedition, 1775
 Battle of Pensacola (1781)
 Siege of Toulon, 1793
 Defense of Ferrol, Spain, 1800
 Recapture of Buenos Aires, 1806

Third period 

The increasing efficiency of the naval artillery made boarding obsolete after the Napoleonic Wars, the marine infantry and marine artillery was merged in 1827 into a brigade,  Brigada Real de Marina  with focus on artillery. The brigade that consisted of two battalions was renamed the  Real Cuerpo de Artillería de Marina in 1833. In the First Carlist War 1834-39, three battalions of marine infantry were organized, serving as field infantry, with an additional battalion raised to reinforce the Royal Guards in Madrid. In 1839 the corps was renamed Cuerpo de Artillería and Infanteriá de Marina. In 1841 the infantry was transferred to the army. The marine artillery remained in the navy under the name of  Cuerpo de Artillería de Marina . However, in 1848, the naval infantry was re-established by the formation of a new Corps,  Cuerpo de Infantería de Marina, then as an infantry regiment organized into three battalions and the regimental HQ, as well as support units and the band. The marine artillery was abolished in 1857. The five battalions of marine infantry were reorganized in 1869 to three regiments, one for each naval station. By this time, the mission of the marines changed from naval garrison troops, to a landing force serving mainly in the colonies.

During the Third Carlist War 1872–1876 the marines fought as field infantry. In 1879, the marine infantry academy, the Academia General Central de Infantería de Marina was founded. The colonial wars in the Philippines and on Cuba, with constant landing operations, lead to a reorganization of the marines into three brigades of two regiments each. In 1886 the marines contained four brigades, each with four tercios, while the reorganization of 1893 created three regiments of two battalions each. During the Philippine Revolution and the Spanish–American War the marines fought as part of army divisions.

Though Spain's empire was dismembered in the nineteenth century the marines continued to be active abroad. Its most important actions in this period were:
 Santo Domingo (1804)
 Cochinchina (Vietnam) (1858)
 Mexico (1862)
 Cuba and Philippines (1898)
 Morocco (1911)
  These actions were carried out by the Batallones Expedicionarios (Expeditionary Battalions), some of them campaigning abroad for up to ten years.

Fourth period 

At the end of the World War I, the Battle of Gallipoli made almost all countries abandon the idea of amphibious assault. The world's marine corps fell into a deep crisis, with the Spanish Marine Infantry being no exception, though it enjoyed success during the Third Rif War in its innovative Alhucemas amphibious assault in 1925, when it employed coordinated air and naval gunfire to support the assault.

Owing to its high-profile action in the unpopular Rif Wars, the Spanish Navy Marine corps was branded as a leftover of the Spanish colonial era. After the proclamation of the Second Spanish Republic in 1931, the reforms of the armed forces introduced by newly nominated Republican Minister of War Manuel Azaña within the first months of the new government sought to disband the corps.

Before it was officially disbanded, however, the Spanish Civil War intervened and the corps split and served both sides with the garrisons of Ferrol and Cádiz on the Nationalist side and the garrison of Cartagena, as well as a detachment in Madrid, on the Republican side. During the bitterly fought war the Marines performed garrison duties, led landing parties, and provided expert artillery and machine gun crews. The Republican 151 Brigada Mixta fought mostly inland battles far away from the sea. Photographer Robert Capa took pictures of the Spanish Marine Infantry in the Battle of the Segre. Republican Infantería de Marina Lieutenant Colonel Ambrosio Ristori de la Cuadra, killed in action during the Siege of Madrid, was posthumously awarded the Laureate Plate of Madrid.

Fifth period 
After the civil war, during the dictatorship of Francisco Franco, the strength of the Infantería Marina was increased. In 1957, the Grupo Especial Anfibio (Amphibious Special Group) was created, and the Spanish Marine Infantry returned to its primary duty as a Landing Force Mission. In 1958 it established a beachhead in Spanish Sahara and Ifni during the Ifni War. The capabilities and strength of the Spanish Marine Infantry were increased: new amphibious vehicles, anti-tank weapons, individual equipment and artillery.

The Tercio de Armada (TEAR) became the main amphibious unit and has experienced several restructures that led to the E-01 Plan, which defines the requirements and structures from the year 2000 for the Spanish Marine Infantry. The Spanish Marines have been present in Europe, Central America and Asia in an anonymous role as an "emergency force" ready to evacuate civilians in conflict areas, or as a deterrence force in providing cover for the actions of allied forces.  The current base for the Spanish Marines is in San Fernando.

Modern Day
The Spanish Marine Infantry have been deployed to various NATO operations such as Afghanistan.

Special operations deployments 

In June 2009, the Special Naval Warfare Force (FGNE) was created through the fusion of the Special Operations Unit (UOE) of the Marine Infantry as well as the Special Combat Divers Unit (UEBC) and the Special Explosives Defusers Unit (UEDE) from the Navy Diving Center.  The FGNE is organized inside the whole Navy. This unit has taken part in several operations including Atalanta in Somalia, United Nations Interim Force in Lebanon, Hispaniola in Haiti and the hijack of the fishing vessel Alakrana in Somali waters.

Organization

Marine brigade
The main fighting Force of the Spanish Marine Infantry is the Marine Infantry Brigade, which includes the following units:

 Marine Infantry Brigade (BRIMAR)
 Headquarters Battalion, with 1x Headquarters, 1x Signals, 1x Military Intelligence, Battlefield Surveillance & Electronic Warfare and 1x Reconnaissance & Target Acquisition Company
 1st Landing Battalion, with 1x HQ & Service, 3x Naval Fusiliers and 1x Weapons Company
 2nd Landing Battalion, with 1x HQ & Service, 3x Naval Fusiliers and 1x Weapons Company
 3rd Mechanized Landing Battalion, with 1x HQ & Service, 2x Mechanized (Piranha IIIC 8x8), 1x Tank (M60A3 TTS) and 1x Weapons Company
 Amphibious Mobility Group, with 1x HQ & Service, 1x Engineer, 1x Amphibious Assault Vehicle, 1x Anti-Tank (TOW) and 1x Boat Company
 Artillery Landing Group, with 1x HQ & Service, 2x Field Artillery (105mm Mod. 56), 1x Self-propelled Artillery (155mm M109AE), 1x Air-Defense Artillery Battery (Mistral) and 1x Fire Support Coordination and Control Company
 Combat Service Support Group, with 1x HQ & Service, 1x Transport, 1x Medical, 1x Supply, 1x Maintenance Company and 1x Beach Organization & Movement Company

Protection Forces

The Protection Force (FUPRO) is in charge of ensuring the security of naval and other designated facilities and contains around 2000 troops. FUPRO is commanded by a brigadier general and is made up of the following battalion sized Tercios (En:Thirds): 
 Tercio del Norte (TERNOR) - Northern Regiment
 Tercio de Levante (TERLEV) - Eastern Regiment
 Tercio del Sur (TERSUR) - South Regiment
 Unidad de Seguridad del Mando Naval de Canarias (USCAN) - Canary Islands Naval Command Security Unit
 Agrupación de Infantería de Marina de Madrid (AGRUMAD) - Madrid Marine Infantry Group

Special Forces
See article: Fuerza de Guerra Naval Especial

The Fuerza de Guerra Naval Especial (FGNE) is the special operations force of the Spanish Navy specializing in maritime, land and coastal environments. It is made up of the former Special Naval Warfare Command, which comprised the Special Operations Unit (UOE) of the Tercio de Armada and the Special Combat Divers Unit (UEBC). 
 
These units are grouped into elements with the following main tasks:

 Command and control: Command Group and Staff and CIS Platoon of the Staff and Support Unit
 Combat: Estoles
 Combat Support (CSU): Boat and parachute unit of the Staff and Support Unit.
 Combat Services Support (CSSU): Health, Provisioning, Transportation, folding, Weapons and Material and Cargo of the Staff and Support Unit

Marine Company of the Royal Guard

The Compañía Mar Océano de la Guardia Real was created on 1 December 1981 as part of the Royal Guard. Its organization is that of a Rifle Company.

Naval Police

The Naval Police Units are basically organized for the performance, both in peace and in war, of specific security and order missions. They fulfill the duties of surveillance of units and units of the Navy, custody, escort and regulation of transport and military convoys, protection of authorities, identification of personnel and vehicles, etc. In the exercise of their functions they will have the character of agents of the authority.

Target Acquisition and Reconnaissance (TAR) Company
The Compañía de Reconocimiento y Adquisición de Blancos (Target Acquisition and Reconnaissance, TAR) was created in 2012, replacing the Reconnaissance Unit (URECON) assigned to the Headquarters Battalion. Its mission is the reconnaissance for the Marine Infantry Brigade (BRIMAR) operations. Its tasks are observation and reconnaissance, target acquisition, control of fire support (artillery and air strikes), close air support (helicopter precision marksmanship), direct action and mobility. For this, the most veteran marines train in insertion / extraction using skydiving and diving techniques.

Sección Martín Álvarez
While she remained active, the Spanish aircraft carrier Príncipe de Asturias (R11) had an assigned section of embarked Marines who were responsible for the security and control of the vessel, conducting Maritime Interdiction Operations (MIO) using helicopters or RIBs.

Once the ship began its decommissioning process, the Section was dismantled and its members assigned to other units.

Personnel structure
{| class="wikitable"
| colspan="7"  align="center" |Spanish Marine Infantry Direct Entry 2018
|-
! align="left" width="100" | Rank Level
! align="left" width="300" | Education
! align="left" width="350" | Training
! align="left" width="100" | Rank Span
|-
|rowspan=3 |Officers||  Bachillerato and University Entrance Exam  18–21 years old || Escuela Naval Militar (ENM) 5 years ||rowspan=3| First Lieutenant - Major General
|-
| Bachelor's degree, not older than 26 years || rowspan=2|ENM 1 year
|-
| Master's degree, not older than 27 years
|-
|rowspan=3| Non-commissioned officers|| Bachillerato   18–21 years old ||rowspan=3| Escuela de Infantería de Marina General Albacete Fuster* Curso de Acceso a la Escala de Suboficiales 3 years || rowspan=3|OR6 - OR9 
|-
|Técnico Medio (secondary vocational degree), not older than 21 years
|-
| Entrance exam to Vocational College,not older than 21 years
|-
|Men|| Educación Secundaria Obligatoria18–29 years of age ||  Escuela de Infantería de Marina General Albacete Fuster:* Curso de Acceso a Militar Profesional de Tropa y Marinería||  OR1 - OR5
|-
|Sources: ||colspan=3|<ref name="Profecion">[http://www.reclutamiento.defensa.gob.es/upload/la-profesion-militar-2017.pdf "La Profecíon Militar." Fuerzas Armadas Españolas.]  2018-07-29.</ref>
|-
|}

Ranks of the Spanish Marine Infantry 
Even though the ranks of the Marine Infantry are similar to Spanish Army ranks they wear also sleeve and cuff insignia to recognize them as part of the naval establishment, aside from shoulder rank insignia.

Commissioned officer ranks
The rank insignia of commissioned officers.

Other ranks
The rank insignia of non-commissioned officers and enlisted personnel.

Officer Cadets and NCO Candidates

The Spanish Marine's Decalogue

Original Spanish 
 1º mandamiento : Mi primer deber como infante de marina es estar permanentemente dispuesto a defender España y entregar si fuera preciso mi propia vida
 2º mandamiento : Seré siempre respetuoso con mis mandos, leal con mis compañeros, generoso y sacrificado en mi trabajo
 3º mandamiento : Estaré preparado para afrontar con valor abnegación y espíritu de servicio cualquier misión asiganada a la Infantería de Marina
 4º mandamiento : Seré siempre respetuoso con las tradiciones del cuerpo, estaré orgulloso de su historia y nunca haré nada que pueda desprestigiar su nombre
 5º mandamiento : Ajustaré mi conducta al respeto de las personas, su dignidad y derechos serán valores que guardaré y exigiré
 6º mandamiento : Como Infante de marina la disciplina constituirá mi norma de actuación, la practicaré y exigiré en todos los cometidos que se me asignen
 7º mandamiento : Como Infante de marina mi misión será sagrada, en su cumplimiento venceré o moriré
 8º mandamiento : Aumentar la preparación física y mental será mi objetivo permanente
 9º mandamiento : Seré duro en la fatiga, bravo en el combate, nunca el desaliento en mi pecho anidará, nobleza y valentía serán mis emblemas
 10º mandamiento : ¡Mi lema! ... ¡Valiente por tierra y por mar!

English 
 1st commandment: As a Marine my first duty is to be constantly ready to defend Spain and give my life if necessary.
 2nd commandment: I shall be always loyal with my brothers, respectful with my superiors, generous and devoted to my task.
 3rd commandment: I shall be always ready to face with courage, dedication and spirit of service any mission assigned to the Spanish Marine Corps.
 4th commandment: I shall be always respectful about the traditions of the Corps, be proud of its history and will never do anything that may adversely reflect on its name.
 5th commandment: I shall guide my conduct with respect for people, their dignity and rights I shall guard.
 6th commandment: As a Marine, discipline will be my standard of acting in all tasks assigned to me.
 7th commandment: As a Marine, my mission is sacred; in its fulfillment, I shall either win or die.
 8th commandment: Improving my body and training my mind shall be my permanent goals.
 9th commandment: I shall be strong on fatigue, brave in battle, discouragement shall never nest in my heart, for honor and courage are my banners.
 10th commandment: My motto!: Bravery in land and in the sea!

Equipment

Infantry weapons

Pistols 
 Llama M82 (almost fully replaced by the FNP-9)
 FN Herstal P9-17
 SIG Sauer P230 (silenced version. Used by the Special Naval Warfare Force)
 Glock 17 Gen.5 (standard issue pistol used by the Special Naval Warfare Force)
  Heckler & Koch USP-Compact

Assault rifles 
 Heckler & Koch G36: E, K (short barrel) and C (carbine) versions in active service.
Heckler & Koch HK-416A5 (used by the Special Naval Warfare Force)
CETME: Some CETME LV (with SUSAT visor) and LC (with retractable stock) in 5.56mm NATO and CETME C in 7.62mm NATO remain in limited service.

Grenade launchers 
 AG36
 LAG-40M1
 Mk.19 Mod.3

Sniper rifles 
 Heckler & Koch HK417 SNIPER
 Accuracy International Arctic Warfare (including AXM and AXMC .338)
 Barrett M82A1
 Barrett M95

Submachine guns 
 Heckler & Koch MP5 (A3, A4 and A5 versions remain in service)
 FN P90

Machine guns 
 FN Minimi Para 5.56×45mm NATO 
 FN Minimi MK3 7.62×51mm NATO)
 CETME Ameli 5.56×45mm NATO (Replaced by FN Minimi)
 Rheinmetall MG-3 7.62x51mm NATO (Replaced by FN Minimi. Used only in vehicles or as stationary weapon)
 Browning M-2 HB QCB

Anti-tank weapons 
 Instalaza C-100 Alcotán 100mm
 Instalaza C-90C 90mm

Artillery 
 ECIA 81 mm mortar
 M-109A5E. Six vehicles loaned from the Spanish Army
 12 OTO Melara M-56

Guided missiles 
 TOW 2A (anti-tank)
 Spike missile (anti-tank)
 Mistral (anti-aircraft)

Vehicles 
 17 M-60A3 TTS (being phased out of service)
 39 Piranha IIIC 8x8 (16 ACV, 2 command vehicles, 1 ambulance, 1 recovery vehicle, 1 for Electronic Warfare, 4 sapper vehicles and 4 recon vehicles armed with a 30mm main gun)
 19 AAV-7A1 (17 AAVP, 1 AAVC, 1 AAVR)
 123 Humvee (will be replaced for URO VAMTAC ST5 BN3)

Traditions

Hymn
The Marcha Heroica de la Infanteria de Marina (Heroic March of the Marine Infantry), also known as the Himno de la Infantería de Marina is the official march of the Spanish Marines. It was authored by J. Raimundo and composed by Colonel Don Agustín Díez Guerrero. The text is as follows:

Motto
Its official motto is "Per Terra et Mare" ("By Land and Sea"), which is also used as the motto of the Royal Marines and is also similar to other marine units.

Bands

The Music Band of the Marines is the military band of the Marine Infantry and the larger Spanish Navy. For this, it has the Music Band, created in 1950, it is made up of a select group of non-commissioned officers and professional musicians. Its first performance was in the Paseo de la Castellana in Madrid on 1 April 1951. It marches in both military ceremonies and parades, as well as in civil events. Based in Madrid it serves as the successor to bands of both that service and the whole of the Navy. The Madrid Marine Corps Ground (AGRUMAD) Music Band, also based in Madrid, also serves this branch. Since 1990, which was the year of its reestablishment, it has participated in concerts organized by the aforementioned association as well as military festivals in Spain. In 1970, it performed in the International Contest of Military Music Bands held in Valencia in 1970, in which he obtained 1st prize. It also has taken part in foreign activities in neighboring countries such as Belgium.

Uniforms

Source:

See also 
 Marine (military)
 Unidad de Operaciones Especiales (UOE)
 Alonso Pita da Veiga at the "Battle of Pavia" captured King Francis I of France (1513–1525)
 Miguel de Cervantes Spain's most famous Marine, injured at the Battle of Lepanto (1571), where the Spanish marines played a decisive part.
 Salve Marinera, Spanish Navy anthem. Some of its best versions are sung by choruses of the Infantería de Marina
 Armada of Spain
 Spanish Republican Navy

References 
Notes

External links 

 Official site
 El Tercio de Armada (BRIMAR) (SP Marines Brigade)
 Spanish Marines History
 Spanish Marines Portal
 Salve marinera – Anthem (by the Chorus of Infanteria de Marina and Escuela Nacional de Marineria) and Video

Spanish Navy
Military of Spain
Infanteria de Marina
Marines
1537 establishments in Spain